Yves Piétrasanta (19 August 1939 – 28 May 2022) was a French politician. He served as the mayor of Mèze from 1977 to 2001. Piétrasanta also served as The Greens Member of the European Parliament for France. He was a president candidate of the Génération Ecologie in 2012, later withdrawing on 7 February 2012 and joining another politician, François Hollande's campaign team. Piétrasanta died in May 2022, at the age of 82.

References 

1939 births
2022 deaths
20th-century French politicians
21st-century French politicians
The Greens (France) politicians
Ecology Generation politicians
Radical Party of the Left politicians
Leaders of political parties in France
Mayors of places in Occitania (administrative region)
The Greens (France) MEPs
MEPs for France 1999–2004
People from Hérault